İçören or Teffe is a village in the Savur District of Mardin Province in Turkey. The village had a population of 1,037 in 2021.

It is populated by Arabs who are part of the adjacent Kurdish Dereverî tribe.

References 

Villages in Savur District
Arab settlements in Mardin Province